Eygelshoven is a village, since 1982 part of the town of Kerkrade, in the southeast of the Netherlands, close to the German and Belgian borders.

It has two former coal mines, Laura and Julia, which were named after the wives of the two owners. Both pits closed in 1974.
The local soccer club is also named after the former coal mines.

Eygelshoven has a small former church from the sixteenth century, which stands on top of a hill. In 1922, another church was built. Architect Alphons Boosten designed the new church. Plans to demolish the old church were abandoned in favour of a new use as a chapel and because of its historical worth.

A third Roman Catholic church was built in 1957, the Pastoor van Arskerk, which was torn down in 1994 when it became redundant.

The old mining village of Eygelshoven was a separate municipality until 1982, when after more than eight centuries it was merged with Kerkrade.

The dialect spoken in Eygelshoven is not the Ripuarian Kerkrade dialect, but a local East Limburgish variety called Egelzer plat. One of the biggest differences between the two is the pronunciation of the letter ; in Eygelshoven, it is pronounced as a voiced velar fricative, as in southern Standard Dutch, whereas in Kerkrade it is pronounced as a palatal approximant (as in Colognian), except after back vowels.

Transportation  
Eygelshoven railway station
Eygelshoven Markt railway station

Gallery

See also 
List of mayors of Eygelshoven

References

External links  
 

Populated places in Limburg (Netherlands)
Former municipalities of Limburg (Netherlands)
Mining communities in the Netherlands
Kerkrade